Köping Basket, also known as The Köping Stars, is a basketball club based in Köping, Sweden. The club was founded in 2003, but changed its name for the men's team to Köping Stars in January 2018. The club plays its home games in the Karlbergshallen. Since the 2018–19 season, Stars plays in the Basketligan, the highest tier of basketball in Sweden.

Players

Current roster

Notable former players
Austin Price (born 1995), American

Honors
Total titles: 2
Superettan
Champions (1): 2017–18

Basketligan
Third place (1): 2019–20*

References

Basketball teams established in 2003
Basketball teams in Sweden